Changur (also Romanized as Changūr; also known as Chanqūr and Jankūr) is a village in Sojas Rud Rural District, Sojas Rud District, Khodabandeh County, Zanjan Province, Iran. At the 2006 census, its population was 468, in 102 families.

References 

Populated places in Khodabandeh County